Narimatsu (written: 成松) is a Japanese surname. Notable people with the surname include:

, Japanese boxer
, Japanese samurai

Japanese-language surnames